Plebejus argyrognomon, common name Reverdin's blue is a butterfly of the family Lycaenidae. The species is named after Jacques-Louis Reverdin.

Subspecies
Subspecies include:
 Plebeius argyrognomon argyrognomon Korb & Bolshakov, 2011 – (South Urals, SW. Siberia, Altai Mountains, Prisayanye)
 Plebejus argyrognomon buchara (Forster, 1936) – (Uzbekistan)
 Plebejus argyrognomon caerulescens (Grum-Grshimailo, 1893) – (South Western Siberia)
 Plebejus argyrognomon danapriensis (Stempfer-Schmidt, 1932)
 Plebejus argyrognomon euergetes (Stauder, 1914) – (Western and Southern Europe)
 Plebejus argyrognomon letitia (Hemming, 1934) (Italy)
 Plebejus argyrognomon praeterinsularis (Verity, 1921)
 Plebejus argyrognomon anceps Churkin, 2004 – (Mongolia)

Distribution
This species can be found in Central and Southern Europe, Caucasus, in mountains of Southern Siberia, Mongolia and Amur River.

Habitat

Description
Plebejus argyrognomon has a wingspan of 28–34 mm. These small butterflies present a sexual dimorphism. The upperside of the wings is violet-blue in males, with a narrow, black border and a white fringe, while in the females it is dark brown, with black bordered orange lunules at the outer edge, especially visible on the hindwings. The underside of the wings is light beige in both sexes, with several black spots surrounded by white, an orange stripe and a marginal series of black spots pupillated in silvery blue-green. Caterpillars are pale green with orange brown longitudinal stripes, up to 20 millimeters long.

This species is similar to Plebejus argus, Plebejus idas, Plebejus pylaon and Polyommatus escheri. In Plebejus argyrognomon the underside of the wings is similar to Plebejus argus and Plebejus idas, but the background color is more gray and the black spots are relatively smaller.

Biology
The species fly in two broods from May to August depending on the location. The larvae feed on Coronilla varia, Securigera varia, Trifolium repens, Melilotus officinalis, Medicago sativa, Lotus corniculatus, Onobrychis viciifolia, Vicia sativa and Astragalus glycyphyllos. Larvae are attended by ants Lasius niger, Lasius alienus, Myrmica sabuleti, Myrmica scabrinodis and Camponotus vagus.

References

External links

 Lepiforum.de
 Svenska fjarilar
 Lepidoptera collection

Plebejus
Butterflies of Europe
Butterflies described in 1779